"Judgement Day" is a short story by Flannery O'Connor. It was published in 1965 in her short story collection Everything That Rises Must Converge. O'Connor finished the collection during her final battle with lupus. She died in 1964, just before her final book was published. A devout Roman Catholic, O'Connor often used religious themes in her work. "Judgement Day" contains many similarities to one of O'Connor's earliest short stories, "The Geranium."

"All my stories are about the action of grace on a character who is not very willing to support it, but most people think of these stories as hard, hopeless and brutal."—Flannery O'Connor

Plot summary 
Tanner is an old white man from Georgia who has gone to live with his daughter in New York City after a doctor of mixed white and black ancestry purchases the land on which Tanner and his friend Coleman, an African American, had been squatting in Georgia. Out of pride, Tanner refuses to operate a distillery on the land for the doctor and instead chooses to move in with his daughter who thinks he should leave his shack in Georgia.

Tanner takes pride in his history of dealing with African Americans and remembers his first encounter with Coleman when he was going to threaten him with a pen knife as he did most of the other African Americans who were working with him. Instead of doing this he handed Coleman a pair of hand-whittled eye glasses and they later developed a close friendship. When Tanner tries befriending his African American neighbor in New York and calls the native New Yorker neighbor "preacher," Tanner's motivations are misinterpreted, and the neighbor attacks Tanner, causing him to have a debilitating stroke.  While recovering Tanner seeks assurance from his daughter that she will eventually bury him in Georgia and not New York.  She agrees but he overhears her saying that she will not do so. Although somewhat disabled, Tanner tries escaping back to Georgia but collapses in the stairwell. He fantasizes about being shipped home in a coffin while still alive and in his reverie mistakes his African-American neighbor for Coleman, who sticks his arms and legs through the spokes under the banister where he is later found dead.  Tanner's daughter initially buries him in New York but eventually reburies him in Georgia when she feels overwhelming guilt about not following his wishes.

References

Short stories by Flannery O'Connor
1964 short stories